Prairie Township is one of twenty-four townships in Bates County, Missouri, and is part of the Kansas City metropolitan area within the USA.  As of the 2000 census, its population was 153.

The township derives its name from the community of Prairie City, Missouri.

Geography
According to the United States Census Bureau, Prairie Township covers an area of 26.16 square miles (67.77 square kilometers); of this, 25.88 square miles (67.04 square kilometers, 98.92 percent) is land and 0.28 square miles (0.73 square kilometers, 1.08 percent) is water.

Unincorporated towns
 Papinville at 
 Prairie City at 
(This list is based on USGS data and may include former settlements.)

Adjacent townships
 Pleasant Gap Township (north)
 Hudson Township (northeast)
 Rockville Township (east)
 Bacon Township, Vernon County (southeast)
 Blue Mound Township, Vernon County (south)
 Osage Township, Vernon County (southwest)
 Osage Township (west)
 Lone Oak Township (northwest)

Lakes
 Carrico Lake
 Helem Lake
 Kineberger Lake
 Prairie Lake

School districts
 Rich Hill R-IV

Political districts
 Missouri's 4th congressional district
 State House District 120
 State House District 125
 State Senate District 31

References
 United States Census Bureau 2008 TIGER/Line Shapefiles
 United States Board on Geographic Names (GNIS)
 United States National Atlas

External links
 US-Counties.com
 City-Data.com

Townships in Bates County, Missouri
Townships in Missouri